Foul Bay ("uncleaned bay") is a bay on the Egyptian side of the Red Sea, in the Red Sea Governorate.

Geography
Foul Bay is located slightly north of the Tropic of Cancer. The town which lies at the most inland section of the bay is Berenice (Barnīs). The northern part of Foul Bay is a peninsula called Ras Banas.

The ancient ruins of Berenice Troglodytica are located on the bay.

Islands
Foul Bay has many islands that were formed by an upthrust of rock near the mantle during the convergence of two continental plates under the Red Sea. Some of the most noteworthy are:
Mukawwa Island
Rocky Island 
St. John's Island

Recreation
Foul Bay is popular among tourists for its diving opportunities. Strong and dangerous currents limit only experienced divers to some places where they can observe corals.

References

Bays of Egypt
Red Sea Governorate